The Margaret Lyttle Memorial School Junior Campus is the junior campus of Preshil. It was designed by Kevin Borland. The buildings that Kevin Borland designed at the Preshil School are experimental in design and use triangular and hexagonal geometries together with diagonals in both plan and section. This creates a variety of internal and external spaces, irregular forms and buildings that strongly deviates from the conventional school buildings of that time. The precise forme of each building and its detailing is counteracted by the use of raw timber posts and beams.

The campus size is not much bigger than a large residential block in the area, which creates a lively density of play spaces, trees and buildings. The buildings are laid out in a labyrinthine, non-hierarchical and non-institutional way, integrating the new buildings with the existing 1930s cottage and the landscape on the site. The buildings were designed to accommodate the school's approach to active learning, embodied in the child-scaled and multi-purpose buildings.

The principal is Josh Brody.

Description
Kevin Borland Hall (1962) 
The first building Kevin Borland designed for the school was the 'Preshil school hall', later renamed to 'Kevin Borland Hall', constructed in 1962. It was designed for multi-purpose use and with its octagonal shape it was a clear departure from the usual nave-like school halls. It is most famous for its intricate octagonal timber roof structure with skylights. It has wooden beams that span both the hall and the sheltered bays outside of it. The roof is clad in steel deck, and the walls are built of grey concrete blocks. In 1959 Kevin Borland and Geoff Trewenack designed glazed pyramidal skylights in the McCarthy-house that acted as a precedent of the roof structure at the Preshil school hall.

House, prep room and library (1930s, 1964, 1975)
In 1994 Borland designed classrooms for pre-school children in an addition to the east end of the original house (the 1930s), incorporating what once was a bedroom and sitting room of the house. Borland wanted to design an informal building that referred to the kid's scale with a combination of small and large spaces. Large, open classrooms with mezzanine floors that can be reached with ladders, provide the kids with an opportunity to isolate themselves from the group when they want to. The addition is a rectangular timber building with an elevated verandah along its length. In 1975 a second addition to the original house was made by Borland and his associate, Jenny Shannon. This time it was a second-floor addition to the rear of the original house. It is an irregular form built with brick, raw timber and glass with multiple levels. It was supposed to be a staff room, but quickly turned into the school library, with a good view of the site.

The 'tree house' (1965
The 'Treehouse', built in 1965, consists of two elevated rectangular timber classrooms, with long window-shades by timber slats and timber bays along one side of the building. The two rooms are separated by a timber deck, through which an Italian Cyprus grows, giving the building its name. Underneath the deck is a space used for woodwork classes and sandpits.

Multi-purpose tutorial rooms (1939, 1969)
The original rectangular classroom, built 1939, was modified by Kevin Borland together with Philip Cohen as assistant architect in 1969. The intent was to create multi-purpose 'tutorial' classrooms that provides private and community spaces. This is achieved by large classrooms that can be divided with folding doors. The building is long, rectangular and with an open veranda along the north side.

The 'home-rooms' (1972)
In 1972, Borland and assistant architect John Kenny built the irregularly planned timber building called the 'home rooms'. It has a variety of spaces on different levels that are linked by steps, and a mezzanine level for the children to find private places in that can be reached by ladder. To provide spaces for individual activities, the west wall zig-zags.

Key influences and design approach

The schools approach education informed the design approach used.  The layout accommodates active learning throughout the many internal and external spaces provided. The school's pupils were involved in the design process, providing feedback to both the architect and the teachers.

Preshil, and in particular those buildings designed by Borland, continue a relationship began in the early 20th century between experimental teaching techniques, psychoanalysis and experimental architecture. A belief that learning environments are integral to the development of a child was expressed first in Europe in schools such as A. S Neill's Summerhill School and at Dartington Hall where a number of well-known modern architects worked. In Australia, the Koornong School at Warrandyte (1939–1947) continued these ideas, in 1939 commissioning local architect Best Overend to design the school's vernacular-style timber buildings of which only the headmaster's house survives. Borland was familiar with the Koornong School and his Preshil buildings resemble those at Koornong in their light timber construction, elevation and random placement around the site.

The rooms are lit via clerestory windows and walls of sliding glass doors and the internal spaces can be divided by folding doors to allow for different uses. There are many small spaces attached to the main spaces, and elevated platforms which the children can reach by ladders.

In an interview undertaken in 1974 Borland stated: "Observing the fact that all kids love to climb and be on different levels, I designed a building that would reflect this by use of levels, and low spaces for example. They like the comfortable feeling of the low scale – it’s almost the womb-like syndrome".

The buildings at Preshil, designed by Borland and his associates, are experimental in design and materials and reflect the participatory design methods becoming fashionable in architecture in the 1960s and 1970s. At Preshil, school children participated in the design process, evident in the scale and informality of the design. Preshil is an early and outstanding example of the interest of Melbourne architects, led by Borland, in inventive timber architecture, in structural techniques and expressive form, reflecting the exploratory lifestyles of the 1960s and 1970s. Preshil is historically significant in reflecting the social changes taking place during the 1960s, in particular the emergence of a counterculture and dissatisfaction with traditional middle class values, including the conservatism of traditional schools and their educational methods. Preshil is the only progressive school in Melbourne surviving from the major period of interest in progressive schools in the 1920s and 30s, when the relationship between a child's development and their learning environment began to be explored through experimental architecture.

Awards
RAIA Victorian Architectural Medal for Outstanding Building, 1972. School Hall at Margaret Lyttle Memorial School, Kew (1962).

Status of Protection

Protected by:   National Trust of Australia (Victoria)
Grade:    Heritage Place
Remarks:  On 4 October 2004, the National Trust of Australia (Victoria) classified
Preshil Junior School for architectural, historic and social reasons at a
State level. Following the Classification, the National Trust nominated
Preshil Junior School for inclusion onto the Victorian Heritage Register
on 8 October 2004.

Gallery

References

External links
Preshil website.
The Preshil Foundation office: 03 9817 6135
White, N. R. (1995). School matters: the Preshil alternative in education. Melbourne: Mandarin
https://www.google.com.au/search?ix=ucb&sourceid=chrome&ie=UTF-8&q=life+cycle+preshil

Private schools in Melbourne
School buildings completed in 1975
1975 establishments in Australia